Hugo Néstor Conte (born April 14, 1963) is a   volleyball coach and retired player from Argentina, who represented his native country in three Summer Olympics. He was born at Buenos Aires. He currently coaches Volley Cavriago in Italy.

After having finished in sixth place at the 1984 Summer Olympics in Los Angeles Conte was a member of the men's national team that claimed the bronze medal four years later in Seoul, South Korea. Twelve years later he was on the squad ending up in fourth place at the 2000 Summer Olympics. He is considered to be one of the 8 greatest Volleyball players of all time, and the best Argentinian player, next to Waldo Kantor.

With Italian Santal Parma, he won the 1984 European Champions League.

Hugo's son, Facundo   is also an international volleyball player.

Clubs history

References

1963 births
Living people
Volleyball players from Buenos Aires
Argentine men's volleyball players
Argentine volleyball coaches
Olympic volleyball players of Argentina
Volleyball players at the 1984 Summer Olympics
Volleyball players at the 1988 Summer Olympics
Volleyball players at the 2000 Summer Olympics
Olympic bronze medalists for Argentina
Olympic medalists in volleyball
Medalists at the 1988 Summer Olympics
Pan American Games medalists in volleyball
Pan American Games bronze medalists for Argentina
Medalists at the 1983 Pan American Games